Kurt Stössel (26 December 1907 – 15 May 1978) was a German footballer who played as a midfielder or forward and made one appearance for the Germany national team.

Career
Stössel earned his first and only cap for Germany on 26 April 1931 in a friendly against the Netherlands. The away match, which took place in Amsterdam, finished as a 1–1 draw.

Personal life
Stössel died on 15 May 1978 at the age of 70.

Career statistics

International

References

External links
 
 
 
 
 

1907 births
1978 deaths
Footballers from Hamburg
German footballers
Germany international footballers
Association football midfielders
Association football forwards
SC Union 03 Altona players
Dresdner SC players
Holstein Kiel players